The Delaware Fightin' Blue Hens men's soccer team represents the University of Delaware in all men's college soccer competitions. The Blue Hens, have enjoyed a resurgence in conference and national prominence in the last 2 years under head coach Ian Hennessy. The team qualified and lost in the semi-finals of one of the nations top conferences, the CAA, in 2010 before winning its first ever conference championship in 2011. The 2011 team defeated the University of Virginia in the NCAA first round before succumbing to Final Four participant UCLA in the second round. The team's previous apex of success came in the late 1960s and early 1970s, when the Blue Hens qualified into the 1968 and 1970 editions of the NCAA Division I Men's Soccer Championship, to date their only appearances in the tournament.

On November 13, 2011, the Blue Hens earned their first-ever CAA Tournament Championship, thus earning their first berth into the NCAA tournament in 41 years. The team also clinched an NCAA at-large birth in 2013, finishing the season with a record of 14-4-1, and hosted the program's first ever NCAA tournament match in a 2-1 OT loss to St. John's.

References

External links 
 

 
1926 establishments in Delaware
Association football clubs established in 1926